Commercial Bank Centrafrique CBCA, is one of the largest banks in the Central African Republic. It is a member of the Commercial Bank Group and is affiliated with the Commercial Bank Tchad (CBT), the Commercial Bank of Cameroon (CBC), the Commercial Bank Equatorial Guinea (CBGE) and Commercial Bank São Tomé and Príncipe (CBSTP).

See also
 Commercial Bank Group
 Commercial Bank of Cameroon
 Central Bank of Central African States

References

External links
CBCA's page at Annulaires Afrique

Companies of the Central African Republic
Banks of the Central African Republic
Banks with year of establishment missing